The following is a list of presidents of Clare Hall, Cambridge, since the college's foundation in 1966, the term of office for which is fixed at seven years:

1966 Sir Brian Pippard, physicist
1973 Sir Robert Honeycombe, metallurgist
1980 Sir Michael Stoker, virologist
1987 Anthony Low, historian
1994 Dame Gillian Beer, literary critic
2001 Ekhard Salje, mineralogist
2008 Sir Martin Harris, linguist
2013 David John Ibbetson, legal historian
2020 Alan Short, architect

Presidents
Clare Hall